Sami Khader (born 1972) is a Jordanian chess player. He was awarded the title of International Master in 2007.

Chess career
He has represented Jordan in the Chess Olympiad numerous times, including 2010 (5.5/11 on board 1), 2012 (3.5/10 on board 1), 2014 (7/9 on board five) 2016 (8/8 on board 5). and 2018 (2/6 on board 5)

He played in the Chess World Cup 2021, where he was defeated by Sandro Mareco in the first round.

References

External links

Sami Khader chess games at 365Chess.com

1972 births
Jordanian chess players
Living people
Chess Olympiad competitors